Pucaraju (possibly from Quechua puka red, rahu snow, ice, mountain with snow, "red snow-covered mountain") is a mountain in the Cordillera Blanca in the Andes of Peru, about  high. It is situated in the Ancash Region, Huari Province, Huari District. Pucaraju lies on a ridge east of Jacabamba.

References

Mountains of Peru
Mountains of Ancash Region